Highways numbered 144 include:

Canada
 New Brunswick Route 144
 Ontario Highway 144
 Prince Edward Island Route 144

Costa Rica
 National Route 144

India
 National Highway 144 (India)

Japan
 Japan National Route 144
 Fukuoka Prefectural Route 144
 Nara Prefectural Route 144

Malaysia
 Malaysia Federal Route 144

United States
 Interstate 144 (former proposal)
 Alabama State Route 144
 Arkansas Highway 144
 California State Route 144
 Colorado State Highway 144
 Florida State Road 144 (former)
 Georgia State Route 144
 Hawaii Route 144 (former)
 Illinois Route 144 (former)
 Indiana State Road 144
 Iowa Highway 144
 K-144 (Kansas highway)
 Kentucky Route 144
 Louisiana Highway 144
 Maine State Route 144
 Maryland Route 144
 Massachusetts Route 144 (former)
 M-144 (Michigan highway) (former)
 County Road 144 (Hennepin County, Minnesota)
 Missouri Route 144
 Nevada State Route 144 (former)
 New Mexico State Road 144
 New York State Route 144
 County Route 144 (Rensselaer County, New York)
 County Route 144 (Sullivan County, New York)
 North Carolina Highway 144
 Ohio State Route 144
 Oklahoma State Highway 144
 Pennsylvania Route 144
 South Dakota Highway 144
 Tennessee State Route 144
 Texas State Highway 144
 Texas State Highway Loop 144 (former)
 Texas State Highway Spur 144
 Farm to Market Road 144
 Utah State Route 144
 Utah State Route 144 (1933-1969) (former)
 Vermont Route 144
 Virginia State Route 144
 Virginia State Route 144 (1924-1928) (former)
 Wisconsin Highway 144

Territories
 Puerto Rico Highway 144